Jada Renales (born 27 December 1998) is a Trinidadian badminton player. Renales is coached by her father, Derwin Renales, a former national badminton player. She was the national under-19 champion for three consecutive years. At the 2012-2016 Carebaco Junior International tournament, she was 6 times in the second place and 5 times in third place. In 2014, she represented her country competed at the Veracruz Central American and Caribbean Games. In 2017, she won double title at the Solo Open Championships. She clinched the women's and mixed doubles title, and also place second in the singles event. She also received the TTBA's 2012 Most Outstanding Female Junior, 2014 Female Player of the Year, and 2015 Junior Female Player of the Year.

Achievements

BWF International Challenge/Series
Women's Doubles

 BWF International Challenge tournament
 BWF International Series tournament
 BWF Future Series tournament

References

External links 
 

Living people
1998 births
Trinidad and Tobago female badminton players
Competitors at the 2014 Central American and Caribbean Games